Ethyl iodoacetate is a chemical compound that is a derivative of ethyl acetate. Under normal conditions, the compound is a clear, light yellow to orange liquid.

Applications
Used by the British during World War I, it was codenamed SK gas, for the initials of South Kensington, where it was developed.

Like many alkyl iodides, ethyl iodoacetate is an alkylating agent, which makes it useful in organic synthesis, yet toxic. Ethyl iodoacetate is also a lachrymatory agent.

References

Lachrymatory agents
Organoiodides
Ethyl esters
Iodoacetates